The UEFA Intertoto Cup was a European association football competition, held during the summer for European clubs that have failed to qualify for either the UEFA Champions League or the UEFA Cup. It provided "an alternative qualifying route into the UEFA Cup". The tournament did not come under official UEFA sanction until 1995, and was abolished in 2009.

The first tournament provided two winners, both of whom therefore qualified for the 1995–96 UEFA Cup, with Strasbourg and Bordeaux as the winning teams. From the following season to the 2005 contest, three teams were awarded Intertoto Cups, with French teams being the most successful. In 2006, the format was modified to allow eleven clubs to qualify for the second qualifying round of the UEFA Cup, with the Intertoto Cup being awarded to the team that progressed the farthest in the competition. The competition was originally played over two legs, one at each participating club's stadium.

Hamburger SV, Villarreal, Schalke 04 and VfB Stuttgart hold the record for the most victories, with each team winning the competition twice. The only teams to retain the UEFA Intertoto Cup were Villarreal and Schalke, who both retained the cup in 2004 after winning the previous year. Teams from France won the competition on the most occasions, with twelve winners coming from the country.

Winners

Performances

By club

By nation

See also
List of European Cup and UEFA Champions League finals
List of UEFA Cup and Europa League finals
List of UEFA Cup Winners' Cup finals
List of UEFA Super Cup matches
List of UEFA Intertoto Cup winning managers

Notes

References

External links
UEFA Intertoto Cup official history

UEFA Intertoto Cup
UEFA Intertoto Cup